Ermita is a station on Line 2 and Line 12 of the Mexico City Metro system. According to the Sistema de Transporte Colectivo, Ermita serves as a transfer station of Line 12. It is located in the Benito Juárez borough of Mexico City, directly south of the city centre on Calzada de Tlalpan.

General information
It is a surface station. The station logo depicts a chapel: the Spanish word ermita means a small chapel constructed outside a church. The name of this station refers to San Cosme ermita, constructed in 1526.  The station was opened on 1 August 1970. The Line 12 station was opened on 30 October 2012 as a part of the first stretch of the line between Mixcoac and Tláhuac.

Ermita provides a transfer with trolleybus Line "D", which also connects with Metro Mixcoac, Metro Zapata, and Metro Portales. Ermita is also not far from trolleybus Line "E".

Ridership

Exits

Line 2
East: Calzada de Tlalpan between Av. Repúblicas and Pirineos street, Colonia Miravalle
West: Calzada de Tlalpan between Av. Repúblicas and Pirineos street, Colonia Portales

Line 12
Northeast: Ermita Iztapalapa and Miravalle street, Colonia Miravalle
Southeast: Ermita Iztapalapa and Francisco Rojas González street, Colonia Ermita
East: Calzada de Tlalpan and Ermita Iztapalapa, Colonia Ermita

Gallery

See also 
 List of Mexico City metro stations

References

External links 
 

Ermita
Railway stations opened in 1970
1970 establishments in Mexico
2012 establishments in Mexico
Railway stations opened in 2012
Mexico City Metro Line 12 stations
Mexico City Metro stations in Benito Juárez, Mexico City
Accessible Mexico City Metro stations